Titanic Kadhalum Kavundhu Pogum is an upcoming Tamil-language romantic comedy film written and directed by M. Janakiraman and produced by C. V. Kumar of Thirukumaran Entertainment. The film stars Kalaiyarasan, Anandhi, Ragav Vijay and Ashna Zaveri, with a supporting cast including Kaali Venkat, Gayathrie and Jangiri Madhumitha. The film features music composed by Nivas K. Prasanna with cinematography by Ballu and editing done by Radhakrishnan Dhanapal. The film is scheduled to release on 6 May 2022.

Cast 
 Kalaiyarasan
 Anandhi
  Ragav Vijay 
 Ashna Zaveri
 Gayathrie
 Kaali Venkat
 Jangiri Madhumitha
 Chetan
 Devadarshini
 Varma Ramaswamy
 Divakar
 Arjunan

Production 
In September 2016, producer C. V. Kumar of Thirukumaran Entertainment announced a new project directed by newcomer Janakiraman, who assisted Sudha Kongara during the production of Irudhi Suttru. Janakiraman stated that the film would be on the "romance of three couples, each one coming from a different backdrop". For the lead male roles, Kalaiyarasan, Kaali Venkat and Varma Ramaswamy (of Agathinai fame) were selected. Anandhi was signed to portray Kalaiyarasan's pair, whereas Madhu Shalini and Madhumitha were selected play the love interests of Varma and Kaali Venkat respectively. Nivas K. Prasanna was signed as the composer of the film and V. S. Tharun Balaji, was selected as the cinematographer.

The film entered production during the same month of September, with combination scenes involving the three lead actors were shot within three days. In a turn of events, Ashna Zaveri later replaced Madhu Shalini, while cinematographer Balaji was replaced by Ballu who earlier worked on Iruttu Araiyil Murattu Kuththu and Ghajinikanth. Meanwhile, debutant Radhakrishnan Dhanapal was introduced as an editor of this film, working alongside his commitments on upcoming C. V. Kumar directorial Gangs Of Madras. Shooting of the film took place within Chennai, Kodaikanal, Coimbatore and Bangalore, and major portions of the film were completed during the end of December 2017. The team also entered post-production soon after filming completed. On 29 December 2017, the makers announced the title of the film as Titanic, with the tagline Kadhalum Kavundhu Pogum, a parody of the 2016 film Kadhalum Kadandhu Pogum, which Kumar had produced.

Soundtrack 

The music for the film is composed by Nivas K. Prasanna and had scored 5 songs for the film's album. He initially agreed to work on the film as Janakiraman narrated the script had found him "fresh" and "interesting". Actor Silambarasan sung a "kuthu number" for this film, collaborating with Prasanna for the first time. One of the songs "Kaalamum Kettu Pochu" was released as the first single from the film on 27 September 2018. The song "Gokka Makka" which had vocals crooned by Silambarasan and Pragathi Guruprasad was released as the second single from the album on 15 January 2019. The third single "Yaazhini" was released on 3 April 2019. 
The planned audio launch was delayed multiple times and the film's soundtrack eventually released on 5 February 2020. The launch commenced with a promotional event held at Kamala Cinemas in Chennai, with the film's cast and crew in attendance. A live performance of the songs were hosted by composer Prasanna and his music team. The album met with positive response, with Indiaglitz stated as "a fun loving album which strikes a right chord within the youngsters". Karthik Srinivasan of Milliblog reviewed it as an "exciting album", with Moviecrow noted the album as "delightful" and "refreshing".

Release
With the title being announced, the first look for the film was released on New Year's Day (1 January 2018) and the teaser released during the occasion of Pongal (15 January 2018). However, the film did not have a theatrical release due to the financial troubles. In June 2020, Kumar entered talks to release the film on over-the-top media services.

References 

Films scored by Nivas K. Prasanna
Films set in Chennai
Films shot in Chennai
Indian romantic comedy films
Upcoming directorial debut films
Upcoming films
Upcoming Tamil-language films